A Son of Erin is an extant 1916 silent film comedy drama directed by Julia Crawford Ivers. It was produced by Pallas Pictures and distributed by Famous Players-Lasky and Paramount Pictures. Dustin Farnum and Winifred Kingston (real life husband and wife) star.

Cast
Dustin Farnum - Dennis O'Harhar
Winifred Kingston - Katie O'Grady
Tom Bates - Patrick O'Grady
Jack Livingston - Brian Trelawney
Wilfred McDonald - Terence
Wallace Pyke - Dan O'Keefe
Lee Willard - George Harding
Mabel Wiles - Florence Harding
Hugo B. Koch - John D. Haynes (as Hugh B. Koch)

References

External links
A Son of Erin at IMDb.com

1916 films
American silent feature films
1916 comedy-drama films
1910s English-language films
American black-and-white films
Films directed by Julia Crawford Ivers
1910s American films
Silent American comedy-drama films